Ricardo Henrique da Silva dos Santos (born 13 February 1987) is a Brazilian footballer who plays as a striker.

Career
Santos came to Sweden and Kalmar FF in 2007. He was loaned out to Åtvidabergs IF the following season, where he was the top scorer at the club. Coming back to Kalmar FF when the team unsuccessfully tried to defend their title, Santos established himself in the first team for the coming two seasons.
In August 2012, Santos joined Norwegian club Sogndal.

On 15 December 2014, Santos transferred to Chinese Super League side Guizhou Renhe.

He has been playing with the Japanese J League's Cerezo Osaka since 2016.

Career statistics
.

Honours

Club
Uthai Thani
Thai League 3 (1): 2021–22
Thai League 3 Northern Region (1): 2021–22
Completed first leg of 2022-23 season as Thai League 2 second highest goal scorer with 9 goals.

References

External links
Profile at Cerezo Osaka
 

 Fotbolltransfers profile
 

Living people
1987 births
Brazilian footballers
Brazilian expatriate footballers
Kalmar FF players
Sogndal Fotball players
Cerezo Osaka players
Fagiano Okayama players
J1 League players
J2 League players
Allsvenskan players
Superettan players
Eliteserien players
Expatriate footballers in Sweden
Expatriate footballers in Norway
Expatriate footballers in China
Expatriate footballers in Japan
Jönköpings Södra IF players
Brazilian expatriate sportspeople in Norway
Brazilian expatriate sportspeople in Sweden
Brazilian expatriate sportspeople in China
Chinese Super League players
Volta Redonda FC players
Boavista Sport Club players
Djurgårdens IF Fotboll players
Åtvidabergs FF players
Beijing Renhe F.C. players
People from Volta Redonda
Association football forwards
Sportspeople from Rio de Janeiro (state)